Gilbert S.C. Keith-Agaran is an American attorney and politician serving as a member of the Hawaii Senate from the 5th district. Elected in November 2012, he assumed office in 2013. He previously represented the 9th district in the Hawaii House of Representatives from 2009 to 2013.

Early life and education 
Keith-Agaran was born in Wailuku, Hawaii. After graduating from Maui High School, he earned a Bachelor of Arts degree from Yale University and a Juris Doctor from the UC Berkeley School of Law.

Career 
After graduating from law school, Keith-Agaran returned to Hawaii, eventually working as a partner at Takitani Agaran Jorgensen & Wildman LLLP. He served as the first deputy director of the Hawaii Department of Land and Natural Resources, director of the Hawaii Department of Labor and Industrial Relations, and as the deputy director of the Hawaii Department of Commerce and Consumer Affairs.

Keith-Agaran served as a member of the Hawaii House of Representatives from 2009 to 2013. He was elected to the Hawaii Senate in 2012 and assumed office in 2013. Since 2011, Keith-Agaran has served as chair of the Senate Judiciary Committee. In the 2013–2014 legislative session, he served as vice chair of the Senate Tourism and Hawaiian Affairs Committee. Since 2019, he has also served as vice chair of the Senate Ways and Means Committee and Senate Water and Land Committee.

References 

Living people
Year of birth missing (living people)
Yale University alumni
UC Berkeley School of Law alumni
Hawaii lawyers
Democratic Party members of the Hawaii House of Representatives
Democratic Party Hawaii state senators
People from Wailuku, Hawaii